Louise Wareham Leonard is an American writer born in New Zealand.

Early life and education

Leonard immigrated to New York City in 1977 with her family.

Career
Leonard was an intern reporter in Time's New York Bureau. She then worked as a magazine writer and book reviewer.

Her novels and novellas include Since You Ask, Miss Me A Lot Of, and 52 Men.

52 Men centers on Elise McKnight and fifty-two vignettes of her interactions with various men. The Los Angeles Review of Books wrote "Although in style and tone 52 Men differs from either Elizabeth Hardwick’s Sleepless Nights or Renata Adler’s Speedboat, it is, like both of these books, a novel of impressions unified by the author’s sensibility". It was the basis of the 2016 podcast  "52 Men the Podcast: Women Telling Stories about Men" with 25 episodes featuring Lynne Tillman, Jane Alison, Caroline Leavitt, Emily Holleman, Mia Funk, Eliza Factor, Julia Slavin and many more.

Leonard also wrote the poetry collection, Blood Is Blood,  the 2020 essay "The German Crowd" and works published in Poetry, Tin House, TheRumpus.net, The  Creative Process, Art Monthly Australia and many others.

She was assistant to Black Liberation Founder Reverend Professor James H. Cone at the Union Theological Seminary in New York. and later co-established a non-for-profit aboriginal-owned art center in the outback town of Mt Magnet In Western Australia.

Works 

 Fiery World (Amazon Kindle, 2022)
 Blood is Blood (Amazon Kindle, 2022)
 Since You Ask (Akashic Books, New York, 2004)
 Miss Me A Lot Of (Victoria University Press, New Zealand, 2007) 
 52 Men (Red Hen Press, Pasadena, 2015) 
 "The German Crowd" (Subnivean, 2020)

Awards and honors
1986 Columbia College, Columbia University Representative in the Mount Holyoke Poetry Prize, with judges Seamus Heaney and Joseph Brodsky
1986 Columbia College, Columbia University, Andrew D. Fried Memorial Prize "given to a senior in Columbia College judged by the Columbia College English Department to have excelled in both critical and creative writing"
1999 James Jones First Novel Award for a novel in Progress
2006, 2008 Finalist for The New Zealand Prize in Modern Letters 
2008 Creative New Zealand Grant
2016 Founding Member of the Academy of New Zealand Literature

References

External links

New Zealand Academy of Literature

1965 births
Living people
People from Wellington City
21st-century American novelists
American women novelists
Writers from New York City
Columbia College (New York) alumni
21st-century American women writers
Novelists from New York (state)
International Institute of Modern Letters alumni